Reginald William Rice (14 November 1868 – 11 February 1938) was an English cricketer. He was educated at Jesus College, Oxford, and played cricket for Gloucestershire between 1890 and 1903.

References

1868 births
1938 deaths
English cricketers
Gloucestershire cricketers
People from Tewkesbury
Alumni of Jesus College, Oxford
Oxford University cricketers
Gentlemen cricketers
North v South cricketers
Bedfordshire cricketers
Gentlemen of England cricketers
Sportspeople from Gloucestershire